Moon Ji-in (born Moon Ji-eun on March 1, 1986) is a South Korean actress. She is best known for her role in the 2016 SBS television series The Doctors.

Career
On February 3, 2012, Moon signed an exclusive contract with Entertainment TONG.

On July 20, 2017, Moon signed with new agency Yuleum Entertainment.

On July 25, 2019, Moon moved to Pan Stars Company, the same agency with Jeon Hye-bin and Pyo Ye-jin.

On May 15, 2020, Moon signed with FNC Entertainment.

In July 2021, Moon signed with IOK Company.

Filmography

Television series

Film

Music video appearance

Television shows

Awards and nominations

References

External links
 at FNC Entertainment 

South Korean film actresses
South Korean television actresses
South Korean television personalities
South Korean web series actresses
Living people
1986 births
Seoul Institute of the Arts alumni
21st-century South Korean actresses